San Miguel del Monte (also known as Monte) is a town in Buenos Aires Province, Argentina. It is the county seat of Monte Partido, and was established in 1864.

External links

 Municipal website
Reference Portal de Monte

Populated places in Buenos Aires Province
Populated places established in 1864
Cities in Argentina
Argentina